The Leica Oskar Barnack Award, presented almost continuously since 1979, recognizes photography expressing the relationship between man and the environment. It was known as the Oskar Barnack Award when presented by World Press Photo between 1979 and 1992, and has been known as the Leica Oskar Barnack Award while presented by Leica Camera since 1995.

History and purpose

The Oskar Barnack Award was presented by World Press Photo for the years 1979 to 1992, in the following year. It was named after Oskar Barnack (1879–1936), designer of the first Leica camera, on the hundredth anniversary of his birth.

After a short hiatus, Leica (first the Leica Group but from shortly thereafter Leica Camera) resumed the award in 1995 and has continued it to date (2021). It is now more formally titled the Leica Oskar Barnack Award.

The award is given to "professional photographers whose unerring powers of observation capture and express the relationship between man and the environment in the most graphic form in a sequence of a minimum of 10 up to a maximum of 12 images".

A "Newcomer Award", for photographers aged 25 and below, was added in 2009; a "Public Award", with submissions via i-shot-it.com, in 2014.

The selection process does not demand that jurors recuse themselves from evaluating submissions by photographers from the same agency, for such a situation is not considered to present a juror with a conflict of interest.

Winners, World Press Photo period (1979–1992)

Winners, Leica period (1995 to present)

In 2009, the Leica Oskar Barnack Newcomer Award was added.

In 2014, the Leica Oskar Barnack Public Award was added.

Notes

See also

 List of environmental awards

References

External links
Leica Oskar Barnack Award

Barnack
Barnack
Barnack
Environmental awards